The South Patagonian ice field dispute is a border dispute between Argentina and Chile over the delineation of the boundary line between the two countries on the Southern Patagonian Ice Field, a large expanse of glaciers located in the Patagonian Andes, which is the largest non-polar continental ice field with land access. It is called continental ice in Argentina and southern ice field in Chile, to differentiate it from the northern ice field. As of 2023, the Argentine-Chilean border in this sector is still pending of demarcation.

History

Delimitation 

The area was delimited by the Treaty of 1881 between Argentina and Chile

On August 20, 1888, an agreement was signed to carry out the demarcation of the limits according to the 1881 treaty, appointing the experts Diego Barros Arana for Chile and Octavio Pico Burgess for Argentina. In 1892 Barros Arana presented his thesis according to which the 1881 Treaty had fixed the limit in the continental divortium aquarum, which was rejected by the Argentine expert.

Experts have shown that it is always convenient to take the mountain as a support for the boundary and not the watershed. Rey Balmaceda tells an anecdote of Perito Moreno, who diverted the course of the Fénix River, with the help of a crew of laborers, so that it would stop heading towards the Pacific and would swell the waters of the Deseado River. With this Moreno wanted to demonstrate that the true basis for drawing a solid and efficient line is the mountains and not the course of the waters.

Because differences arose on several points of the border on which the experts could not agree, the demarcation was suspended in February 1892, until the Boundary Protocol between Chile and Argentina 1893 was subscribed, which in its article 1 provides:

This protocol is of particular importance, as the retreat of the glaciers could allow Pacific fjords to penetrate into Argentine territory.

In January 1894 the Chilean surveyor declared that he understood that the main chain of the Andes was the uninterrupted line of peaks that divide the waters and that form the separation of the basins or tributary hydrographic regions of the Atlantic to the east and the Pacific to the west. The Argentine expert Norberto Quirno Costa (Pico's replacement) replied that they had no authority to define the meaning of the main chain of the Andes as they were only demarcators.

In April 1896, the Agreement to facilitate territorial delimitation operations was signed, which appointed the British monarch to arbitrate in case of disagreements. In the minutes of October 1, 1898, signed by Barros Arana and Francisco Pascasio Moreno (Quirno Costa's replacement, who resigned in September 1896) and by his assistants Clemente Onelli (from Argentina) y Alejandro Bertrand (from Chile), the experts:

On the attached map, point 331 is Mount Fitz Roy and 332 is Mount Stokes, both being agreed as boundary markers, although the former is not on the watershed and was taken as a natural landmark. As the experts did not access the area, they established the caveat that if the geographical principle did not run where they had supposed it did, there could be modifications.

When the experts could not agree on different stretches of the border, it was decided in 1898 to resort to Article VI paragraph 2 of the 1881 Boundary Treaty and request Queen Victoria of the United Kingdom for an arbitration ruling on the issue, who appointed three British judges. In 1901, one of the judges, Colonel Thomas Holdich, traveled to study the disputed areas.

The Argentine government argued that the boundary should essentially be an orographic boundary along the highest peaks of the Andes Mountains and the Chilean government argued for a continental watershed. The tribunal considered that the language of the 1881 treaty and the 1893 protocol was ambiguous and susceptible to various interpretations, the two positions being irreconcilable.On May 20, 1902 King Edward VII issued the sentence which divided the territories of the four disputed sections within the boundaries defined by the extreme claims on both sides and appointed a British officer to demarcate each section in the summer of 1903. The award did not issue on the ice field, for in its article III it sentenced:

The award thus considered that in that area the high peaks are water dividing and therefore there was no dispute. Since then, the demarcation of the border in the ice field, between the two mountains, remained pending. In 1914 the Mariano Moreno range was visited by an expedition, however, Francisco Pascasio Moreno already knew of its existence.

Demarcation 

In 1941, the protocol regarding the repositioning of milestones on the Argentine-Chilean border was signed, creating the Joint Commission on Boundaries (COMIX), formed by technicians from both countries. These technicians were to be in charge of demarcating the border on the basis of the criteria established by the 1881 treaty and the 1893 protocol.

On August 29, 1990, Presidents Carlos Saúl Menem and Patricio Aylwin signed the Santiago Declaration, which instructed the Joint Boundary Commission to accelerate demarcation work and issue a report on pending demarcation issues.

On September 12, 1990, the Joint Commission, through Minute No. 132, defined the 24 points that remained to be demarcated on the border. On February 10 and 12, 1990, the Commission met in Punta Arenas, resolving 22 of the 24 areas not yet demarcated.

In Chile it was argued that the experts identified in 1898 as intermediate summits between the Fitz Roy and Stokes mounts: Torre, Huemul, Campana, Murallón, Bertrand, Roma, Bolados, Peineta and Mayo. The Stokes of 1898 was considered to be the Cervantes. Giving definitive character to what they saw according to the techniques and knowledge of their time. With a chart of the Military Geographic Institute of 1972 at a scale of 1:50,000, they determined that the line should be drawn from the Fitz Roy by: Adela range (Torre, Ñato and Grande hills), Doblado, Huemul, Campana, Murallón, Cono, Bertrand, Roma, Oasis, Bolados, Peineta, Mayo, Cervantes, Piedrabuena range, Cubo and from there to the Daudet.

In Argentina it was argued that the demarcation should be made along the highest peaks dividing waters, as agreed in 1881 and with the most modern techniques available to determine it. Taking as a reference 6 charts of the National Geographic Institute made between 1981 and 1991 at a scale of 1:100,000, they determined that the line should be drawn from Fitz Roy to a point on the Mariano Moreno range, from where the criterion of the highest peaks dividing waters is followed by the following hills: Murallón, Torino, Agassiz, Bolados, Onelli Central, a peak of 2. 130 m, Malaspina range, the two hills Inmaculados, Dos Codos range, Pietrobelli range, a hill of the Piedrabuena range, Cubo and Stokes.

The Murallón and Bolados hills were the only two points in common of both intended routes.

On August 2, 1991, Presidents Menem and Aylwin signed an agreement to draw a polygonal line to equitably divide the disputed territory from Mount Fitz Roy to Mount Stokes, leaving aside what had been agreed upon in 1881 and 1893.

The polygonal line began at Fitz Roy, continued in a straight line westward to an unnamed point (2584 m high), then crossed the Viedma glacier to Mount Puntudo and continued through Torino, Roma, Inmaculado, Dos Picos, Teniente Feilberg, Gemelo, Stokes and Daudet. All the points were connected by straight lines.

In his presentation to the congress on February 27, 1992, the Argentine minister Guido Di Tella argued that the polygonal shape had been agreed upon because of the geophysical impossibility to determine where the high peaks that divide waters are located.

The polygonal line was not accepted by the Congresses of the two countries. Argentina claimed the loss of 1057 km² of Los Glaciares National Park and Chile claimed the loss of 1238 km² of Bernardo O'Higgins National Park if the line was approved.

Agreement 

On December 16, 1998, the Agreement was signed to specify the route of the boundary from Mount Fitz Roy to Mount Daudet to replace the proposed polygonal line. The agreement maintains what was signed in the 1881 Treaty, high peaks that divide waters and respects the continental watershed, except in some sectors where straight lines are drawn. It also maintains access for Chile to Mount Fitz Roy, and for Argentina to Mount Stokes.

The territory covered by the Agreement is divided into two sectors:

 Section A: from Murallón Hill to Daudet Hill. The boundary line is determined as follows: starting from Murallón Hill, the line follows the watershed that passes through Torino East, Bertrand-Agassiz North, Agassiz South, Bolados, Onelli Central, Spegazzini North and Spegazzini South. Then the line continues by straight line segments joining, successively, the points marked with the letters A, B, C, D, E, F, F, G, H, I and J. Between J and K it follows the watershed, then by straight lines joining points L and M. It continues along the watershed to N, from where it continues along the watershed through the hills Pietrobelli, Gardener, Cacique Casimiro and point Ñ. Then by a straight line it reaches point O and by another straight line it reaches Teniente Feilberg hill, continues along the watershed up to point P, from where by straight line segments it reaches point Q, Stokes hill, points R, S, T and Daudet hill, where it ends its route.

 Section B: from the summit of Mount Fitz Roy to Cerro Murallón. From the summit of Mount Fitz Roy the line will descend along the watershed to a point at coordinates X=4,541,630 Y=1,424,600. From there it will continue in a straight line to a point located at coordinates X=4,540,950 Y=1,421,200. Then the line will follow the parallel of the site to the West and will be drawn in accordance with the Protocol on Replacement and Placement of Landmarks on the Chilean-Argentine Border of April 16, 1941 and in the Plan of Work and General Provisions governing the Chile-Argentine Joint Boundary Commission.

In the area determined between the parallels of South Latitude 49º10'00" and 49º47'30" and the meridians of West Longitude 73º38'00" and 72º59'00", the Chile-Argentina Joint Boundary Commission must draw up a chart at a scale of 1:50,000 in order to demarcate the boundary, in that sector the Additional Specific Protocol on Shared Water Resources of August 2, 1991 will not be applied.  This sector corresponds to a rectangular territory that goes from a few kilometers north of the summit of Mount Fitz Roy to Mount Murallón, in which there is an area without boundary demarcation. Within this area, however, the agreement itself demarcated the boundary from Fitz Roy to a few kilometers to the southwest (point B), and from the same mountain to the north it was demarcated by means of the 1994 Laguna del Desierto arbitration award.

It was agreed that all waters flowing into and out of the Santa Cruz River shall be considered for all purposes as a water resource belonging to the Republic of Argentina. Likewise, the waters flowing towards the oceanic fjords shall be considered for all purposes as water resources belonging to the Republic of Chile, each Party committing itself not to alter, in quantity and quality, the exclusive water resources corresponding to the other Party.

Boundary area of pending demarcation 

In February 2006 Ricardo Lagos appeared in a photo with the head of the Air Force, General Osvaldo Sarabia, in the undemarcated area, this caused controversy with Argentina.

The Joint Commission on Boundaries that was entrusted by the Agreement to carry out the geographic studies and draw up the 1:50 000 scale chart, an essential requirement to carry out the demarcation on the ground, had not yet been formed as of August 30, 2006. On that date the chancelleries of both countries issued communiqués, the communiqué of the Argentine Chancellery stating that:

The exchange of communiqués had occurred due to the Chilean government's complaint regarding the non-use of the rectangle of the undemarcated area on maps of the Argentine Secretariat of Tourism. On August 24, 2006, the Argentine Undersecretary of Tourism stated that the maps used by the Secretariat of Tourism's website were official because they were approved by the National Geographic Institute of Argentina.

In 2006 Presidents Michelle Bachelet and Néstor Kirchner held a meeting over the cartographic controversy. Kirchner served as the governor of the Santa Cruz Province from 1991 to 2003.

In the maps published in Argentina, until today, the region continues to be shown without the white rectangle, as can be seen in a map of Santa Cruz on a website of an official Argentine agency. While in the official Chilean maps and most tourist maps, the rectangle is shown and it is clarified that the boundary is not demarcated according to the 1998 treaty.

Newspaper reports indicate that on January 8, 2008, daily flights began in Argentine Army helicopters, based in El Chaltén, with personnel from the National Geographic Institute to carry out the geographic surveys necessary to draw up the map prescribed in the Agreement. Reports indicate that Chilean personnel acted as overseers, while the Chilean Army performed similar tasks in other sectors.

In 2006 and 2010 the Argentine Foreign Ministry pressured to solve the dispute.

In 2018, Argentina made a National Ice Inventory in which are included some disputed glaciers.
From September 20 to October 4 of the same year, the Argentine army traveled to into the area that is pending to be demarcated.
This caused controversy mainly in Chile where the mayor of Villa O'Higgins denounced the fact as a "provocation" and made a call to the central government of Chile to reinforce the sovereignty in the zone.

After the Argentine government published its inventory of glaciers including undefined territory the Chilean Foreign Ministry informed that a claim note had already been sent denying the Argentine inventory.

In 2021 there was a controversy since CONAF (from Chile) installed a dome in the Circo de los Altares which its southern part is claimed by both countries.

See also 

 Laguna del Desierto incident
 Beagle conflict
 Puna de Atacama
 Cordillera of the Andes Boundary Case
 Argentina-Chile relations

References

External links 

 Variaciones de glaciares en Campo de Hielo Sur, en el sitio del Laboratorio de Glaciología de la Universidad de Chile.
 Mapa de la poligonal de 1991
 DISCUSIÓN SOBRE EL ACUERDO DE 1998: ¿OBLIGA A CHILE Y ARGENTINA A "POSTERGAR"EL LÍMITE EN CAMPO DE HIELO?

Patagonia
1998 in Chile
Conflicts in Argentina
Disputed territories in South America
Territorial disputes of Argentina
Territorial disputes of Chile
Argentina–Chile relations
Argentina–Chile border